Maurits van Löben Sels (1 May 1876 – 4 October 1944) was a Dutch épée, foil and sabre fencer. He won a bronze medal in the team sabre event at the 1906 Intercalated Games.

References

External links
 

1876 births
1944 deaths
Dutch male épée fencers
Olympic fencers of the Netherlands
Olympic bronze medalists for the Netherlands
Medalists at the 1906 Intercalated Games
Fencers at the 1906 Intercalated Games
Fencers at the 1908 Summer Olympics
People from Meppen
Dutch male foil fencers
Dutch male sabre fencers
20th-century Dutch people